This list of historical markers installed by the National Historical Commission of the Philippines (NHCP) in Central Luzon (Region III) is an annotated list of people, places, or events in the region that have been commemorated by cast-iron plaques issued by the said commission. The plaques themselves are permanent signs installed in publicly visible locations on buildings, monuments, or in special locations.

While many Cultural Properties have historical markers installed, not all places marked with historical markers are designated into one of the particular categories of Cultural Properties.

A marker on the site of the assassination of Aurora Aragon Quezon in Bongabon was rededicated on the site on April 28, 2013 after the original marker dated February 13, 1991 went missing.

There has been an issue regarding the possible relocation of a historical marker dedicated to Francisco "Soc" Rodrigo in Bulakan over ownership issues of the heritage house.

The historical marker for José Rizal in Tarlac City was reported to be in a state of rot in 2011. The marker was relocated and put in a better position in front of the city plaza after 58 years of neglect.

On June 3, 2016, it was the first time for the NHCP to unveil a marker for a nameless personality. A marker was installed in Macabebe, commemorating the leader of the Battle of Bangkusay Channel, the "first native to give up his life for independence."

The first historical marker in the Kapampangan language was unveiled on August 17, 2017 for the Holy Rosary Parish Church of Angeles City. This also served as a rectification for the earlier marker of the Pamintuan Mansion saying that the said house was the site of the first anniversary celebration of the independence of the Philippines. Thus, replacement markers were also installed for the said house.

This article lists one hundred ninety-seven (197) markers from the Region of Central Luzon.

Aurora
This article lists seven (7) markers from the Province of Aurora.

Bataan
This article lists nineteen (19) markers from the Province of Bataan.

Bulacan
This article lists fifty-six (56) markers from the Province of Bulacan.

Nueva Ecija
This article lists twenty-one (21) markers from the Province of Nueva Ecija.

Pampanga
This article lists sixty-nine (69) markers from the Province of Pampanga.

Tarlac
This article lists fourteen (15) markers from the Province of Tarlac.

Zambales
This article lists nine (9) markers from the Province of Zambales.

See also
List of Cultural Properties of the Philippines in Central Luzon

References

Footnotes

Bibliography 

A list of sites and structures with historical markers, as of 16 January 2012
A list of institutions with historical markers, as of 16 January 2012

External links
A list of sites and structures with historical markers, as of 16 January 2012
A list of institutions with historical markers, as of 16 January 2012
National Registry of Historic Sites and Structures in the Philippines
Policies on the Installation of Historical Markers

Central Luzon
Central Luzon